Mallosia nonnigra is a species of beetle in the family Cerambycidae. It was described by Hüseyin Özdikmen and Fatih Aytar in 2012. It is known from Turkey.

This species was described based on a single specimen from Erdemli.

References

Saperdini
Beetles of Asia
Endemic fauna of Turkey
Beetles described in 2012